Eliza was built in Calcutta, India, in 1816. She performed many voyages between England and India under a license from the British East India Company (EIC), and then as a free trader. She also made one voyage on behalf of the EIC. She was still listed in 1860.

Career
A list of vessels trading with India in Lloyd's Register for 1825 shows , D. Sutton, master and owner, sailing for Madras on 28 March 1824. That same day , W. Faith master, Faith, owner, sailed for Bombay. Lloyd's Register for 1825 also shows Eliza (1804)'s master as T. Ward, her owner as Palmer & Co., and her trade as London—Madras.

Captain David Sutton sailed Eliza from the Downs on 10 July 1829. She arrived at Calcutta on 24 November. Homeward bound, she was at Saugor on 26 February 1830, the Cape of Good Hope on 6 May, and St Helena on 6 June. She arrived back at the Downs on 2 August.

Notes and citations
Notes

Citations

1816 ships
British ships built in India
Merchant ships of the United Kingdom
Age of Sail merchant ships
Ships of the British East India Company